Neohaplomyces is a genus of fungi in the family Laboulbeniaceae. The genus contains 3 species:
 Neohaplomyces medonalis
 Neohaplomyces cubensis
 Neohaplomyces neomedonalis

References

External links
Neohaplomyces at Index Fungorum
Neohaplomyces at Encyclopedia of Life

Laboulbeniaceae
Laboulbeniales genera